The Iranian Directorate or Directorate for Iran is a unit of The Pentagon created in 2006 to deal with intelligence on Iran in the context of diplomatic and military tensions between the United States and Iran.  Critics compare it with the Office of Special Plans (OSP) which dealt with controversial intelligence reports about Iraq.

Lt. Col. Barry E. Venable, a spokesman for the Pentagon, confirmed the creation of the directorate for Iran in both a phone conversation and an email message. "As the State Department stated in early March (Daily Press Brief, Mar. 3), the U.S. Government is organizing itself better to address what Secretary Rice called 'one of the great challenges for the United States, a strategic challenge for the United States and for those who desire peace and freedom,' Venable wrote. 'As a counterpart to the State Department's new Office of Iran Affairs, the Department of Defense has split off a new directorate for Iran-related policy issues from the existing Directorate of Northern Gulf Affairs in the Office of Near East and South Asia Affairs (NESA), he added. These regional policy offices fall within the Office of the Assistant Secretary of Defense for International Security Affairs,' and thereafter under Eric Edelman. Edelman, Undersecretary of Defense for Policy.

Membership
The acting director of the Iranian Directorate is not publicly known but has been reported to be military officer Ladan Archin. Some of the other members are: former director of the Office of Special Plans, Abram Shulsky, Project for the New American Century member Reuel Marc Gerecht, and Defense Intelligence Agency analyst, John Trigilio.

Aims

The Los Angeles Times claimed that the purpose of the Iranian Directorate in the Pentagon is to "undercut the government in Tehran" together with the Office of Iranian Affairs in the State Department.

See also
 Stuxnet

References

External links
 Pentagon Iran Office Mimics Former Iraq Office

Iran–United States relations
United States Department of Defense agencies
2006 establishments in Virginia
Defunct United States intelligence agencies